Reckless Till the End is a debut studio album by Italian metalcore band Tasters. It was released on September 16, 2011, via Nuclear Blast.

Track listing

Personnel
Tasters
 Daniele Nelli – vocals
 Luke Pezzini – guitar
 Tommy Antonini – guitar
 Carlo Cremascoli – bass
 Fabrizio Pagni – keyboards, piano, backing vocals
 Ale "Demonoid" Lera – drums
Production
 Recorded, mastered and mixed by Daniele Nelli and Davide Bitozzi

References

2011 debut albums
Tasters (band) albums
Nuclear Blast albums